Clifford Ette (September 1910 – 1995) was an English footballer who played, as an inside-right, for Northampton Nomads, West Ham United, Southall and London League Park Royal.

Career
Ette started his career with Northampton Nomads before signing for West Ham in 1934. He had signed for West Ham following a personal request by Charlie Paynter to turn out in a match against Preston North End. This game was on 3 February 1934 and although he scored a goal, it turned out to be Ette's only game for The Hammers. Mysteriously he was never picked again but later appeared for Southall and London League Park Royal, and captained the Southall team that defeated Swindon Town 3-1 in the 1935–36 FA Cup First Round.

The onset of arthritis finished his footballing career and left Ette disabled in later life.

References

1910 births
1995 deaths
English footballers
Association football forwards
West Ham United F.C. players
English Football League players
Southall F.C. players